Taebukpo Ri Airport is an airport in Pukp'o-ri, Tosan County, Hwanghae-bukto, North Korea.

Facilities 
The airfield has a single grass runway 10/28 measuring 6620 × 282 feet (2018 × 86 m).  It is sited in a river plain.

References 

Airports in North Korea
North Hwanghae